HMAS Diamond Snake was a Snake-class junk built for the Royal Australian Navy during the Second World War. She was launched in 1945 and commissioned into the Royal Australian Navy on 23 July 1945. She was used by the Services Reconnaissance Department and was paid off on 19 October 1945, before being transferred to the Australian Army.

Notes

References

Further reading

Snake-class junks
1945 ships
Ships built in Victoria (Australia)
Ships of the Australian Army